The 2022 Campeonato Catarinense (officially the Catarinense Fort Atacadista 2022 for sponsorship reasons) was the 97th season of Santa Catarina's top-flight football league organized by FCF. The season began on 22 January and ended on 2 April 2022. Avaí were the defending champions but were eliminated in the quarter-finals.

The finals were played between Brusque and Camboriú. Tied 1–1 on aggregate, Brusque won their second title due to having a better performance in the first stage.

Format
The tournament was contested between 12 teams, who first played in a single round-robin tournament. In the first stage, the bottom two teams were relegated to next year's Série B. The final stage was played on a home-and-away two-legged basis. Champions and runners-up qualified for the 2023 Copa do Brasil, while three teams qualified for the 2023 Campeonato Brasileiro Série D.

Participating teams

First stage

Table and Results

Final stage
Starting from the quarter-finals, the teams played a single-elimination tournament. The matches were played on a home-and-away two-legged basis, with the higher-seeded team hosting the second leg. If tied on aggregate, the higher-seeded team would qualified.

Bracket

Quarter-finals

|}

Group A

Brusque qualified for the semi-finals due to having a better campaign.

Group B

Figueirense qualified for the semi-finals.

Group C

Camboriú qualified for the semi-finals.

Group D

Concórdia qualified for the semi-finals due to having a better campaign.

Semi-finals

|}

Group E

Brusque qualified for the finals.

Group F

Camboriú qualified for the finals.

Finals

|}

Group G

Overall table

Top goalscorers

References

Campeonato Catarinense seasons